William Walker (born 31 October 1985 in Subiaco, Western Australia) is a retired Australian professional road racing cyclist and Australian Champion who rode for the Dutch team  between 2005 and 2008 and Spanish team  in 2009. Walker was described as having a motor on par with Lance Armstrong, with a reported recorded VO2 max 94. Walker was also heralded as Australia's next Cadel Evans.

Walker finished second to Dmytro Grabovskyy in the Under 23 World Road Championship in Madrid in 2005. In 2006 he famously crossed the line first in the 2006 Australian Road championships and was awarded the gold medal in both the Elite and Under 23 categories, being the first Under 23 rider in history to race in the Australian champion jersey.

Walker represented Australia in the 2003, 2005, 2007 and 2008 World Road Championships as well as the 2006 Commonwealth Games in Melbourne. He also raced for Rabobank in the 2006 Vuelta España and the 2007 Giro d'Italia.

Walker did not ride for Fuji-Servetto in 2010 due to health issues. He returned to racing in 2012, making a successful return winning the 2012 Tour of Gippsland for Drapac Pro Cycling. Walker moved to the Azerbaijan-based Synergy Baku Cycling Project for the 2014 season. Walker was riding in the Australian National Road Race Championships in January 2014 when he suffered from sustained ventricular tachycardia and he retired from the race and from professional cycling.

Major results 

2003
 1st Stage 4 Bay Classic Series
 1st Overall Giro di Basilicata
1st Stage 1
 5th Time trial, UCI Junior World Road Championships
2004
 1st Overall Tattersalls Cup
 1st Road race, Victorian Road Championships
 1st Overall Tour of Sunraysia
 1st Melbourne–Warrnambool
 1st Stage 13 Herald Sun Tour
 National Under-23 Road Championships
2nd Road race
3rd Time trial
 10th Overall Thüringen Rundfahrt der U23
2005
 1st Stage 2 Circuito Montañés
 2nd  Road race, UCI Under-23 World Road Championships
 2nd Road race, National Under-23 Road Championships
 2nd Overall UCI Oceania Tour
 5th Overall Thüringen Rundfahrt der U23
 7th Overall Tour de l'Avenir
2006
 1st  Road race, National Road Championships
 1st  Road race, National Under-23 Road Championships
 1st  Young rider Classification Tour Down Under
 2nd Overall Thüringen Rundfahrt der U23
 4th Overall Tour Down Under
 4th Overall Volta ao Distrito de Santarem
2007
 Sachsen Tour
1st Mountains classification
1st Points classification
2008
 10th Overall Herald Sun Tour
2009
 1st Stage 3 Geelong Bay Classic Series
2012
 1st Overall Tour of Gippsland
 1st Stage 6 Tour of Tasmania
2013
 1st Victorian Road Championship 
 1st Stage 1 Tour of Toowoomba
 2nd Overall Tour of Thailand
 3rd Overall New Zealand Cycle Classic
 4th Tour de Okinawa
 5th Overall Tour of Hainan

References

External links 

Team website

Australian male cyclists
1985 births
Living people
Cyclists from Perth, Western Australia
Cyclists at the 2006 Commonwealth Games
Sportsmen from Western Australia
Commonwealth Games competitors for Australia